Amandeep Singh (born 17 August 1987) is a New Zealand cricketer who has played four first-class matches for the Canterbury Wizards. He is a right-handed batsman and fast-medium bowler.

Singh was born in India, in the region of Punjab. He attends Lincoln University and plays club cricket for Sydenham.

References

External links

1987 births
Living people
New Zealand cricketers
Canterbury cricketers
Northern Districts cricketers
New Zealand people of Punjabi descent